Sacrifice is the debut album by English rock band Black Widow. It was issued in March 1970 through CBS Records and was produced by Patrick Meehan Jr. The album features the band's best known song "Come to the Sabbat" and its lyrical themes are centred on Satanism and occultism. Sacrifice reached No. 32 on the UK Albums Chart.

Track listing 
All songs written by Jim Gannon except where noted.

 "In Ancient Days" – 7:40
 "Way to Power" – 3:58
 "Come to the Sabbat" (Gannon, Clive Jones) – 4:56
 "Conjuration" – 5:45
 "Seduction" – 5:38
 "Attack of the Demon" – 5:37
 "Sacrifice" – 11:10

Personnel 
 Kip Trevor – vocals
 Clive Jones – flute, saxophone, clarinet
 Jim Gannon – lead and Spanish guitars, vibes
 Zoot Taylor – organ, piano
 Bob Bond – bass
 Clive Box – drums, percussion

References 

1970 debut albums
Black Widow (band) albums
CBS Records albums
Albums produced by Patrick Meehan (producer)